Hounslow West is an area of the London Borough of Hounslow, United Kingdom. It is part of the western residential area of Hounslow but is its own separate area. The area came about with the arrival of the District Railway and then the Piccadilly Line with the opening of what is now Hounslow West tube station and the remodeling of Hounslow Barracks

The area is bounded by the River Crane to the west, Cranford and the A30 road to the north and north-west, Hounslow to the east and south-east and Hounslow Heath to the south.

Features of the area include Beaversfield Park, Hounslows Heath, Beavers Primary School, St Pauls Church and Hounslow Bowls Club.

Nearest stations
Hounslow West tube station
Hounslow Central tube station
Hounslow railway station

Areas of London